Paweł Adamajtis (born 30 August 1990) is a Polish volleyball player. He plays the opposite position.

References

External links
 PlusLiga profile
 LegaVolley profile
 Volleybox profile

1990 births
Living people
Polish men's volleyball players
Projekt Warsaw players
AZS Olsztyn players
AZS Częstochowa players
Expatriate volleyball players in Italy
Expatriate volleyball players in Romania
Polish expatriates in Italy
Polish expatriate sportspeople in Romania